Nicholson Peak, at  above sea level is a peak in the Lemhi Range of Idaho. The peak is located in Butte County in Salmon-Challis National Forest. It is the 98th highest peak in Idaho.

References 

Mountains of Butte County, Idaho
Mountains of Idaho
Salmon-Challis National Forest